Blood Wedding (Spanish: Bodas de sangre) is a 1938 Argentine film written and directed by Edmundo Guibourg, the first film adaptation of Federico García Lorca's 1931 tragic play of the same name. It stars Spanish actress Margarita Xirgu—the main actress with whom Lorca had worked—alongside a cast that included mainly members of her theater company: Pedro López Lagar, Amelia de la Torre, Helena Cortesina, Eloísa Vigo, Amalia Sánchez Ariño, Enrique Diosdado, Alberto Contreras and Luisa Sala. The making of the film was intended as a tribute to Lorca, who had been assasinated in 1936.

See also
 List of Argentine films of 1938

References

External links
 Blood Wedding at Cinenacional.com (in Spanish)
 

1938 films